The AWGIE Award for Music Theatre is awarded by the Australian Writers Guild at the annual AWGIE Awards for Australian performance writing. 

The award is for the script/text, lyrics or book of works written for the theatre in which music plays an integral part, such as opera libretti, musicals, revue, musical theatre, theatre restaurant and original cabaret. To be eligible, works must have had their first formal production in the previous year.

References 

Music Theatre
Australian theatre awards
Musical theatre awards